Mavazekhan-e Sharqi Rural District is in Khvajeh District of Heris County, East Azerbaijan province, Iran. At the National Census of 2006, its population was 4,274 in 994 households. There were 3,496 inhabitants in 981 households at the following census of 2011. At the most recent census of 2016, the population of the rural district was 3,755 in 1,115 households. The largest of its 15 villages was Nahand, with 1,061 people.

References 

Heris County

Rural Districts of East Azerbaijan Province

Populated places in East Azerbaijan Province

Populated places in Heris County